Zakk Cervini is an American record producer, vocal producer, songwriter, and mixing engineer. He was born in Monroe, Connecticut on June 2, 1993. Cervini's work includes collaborations with Simple Plan, Limp Bizkit, Blink-182, All Time Low, Machine Gun Kelly, Yungblud, Bring Me the Horizon, 5 Seconds of Summer, Avicii, Halsey, Good Charlotte, Grimes, Bishop Briggs, Poppy, Bad Omens, Architects, Waterparks, and Sleeping with Sirens. His work on Blink-182’s California landed him his first Grammy Nomination for Best Rock Album in the 59th Annual Grammy Awards.

Career
Cervini began taking guitar lessons at age 9 and used his skills to write and produce for New England hardcore/punk bands throughout the late 2000’s. In 2013, Cervini relocated to Los Angeles, CA. Many of his productions/mixes began gaining popularity, and he signed with MDDN management in 2018. Zakk mainly works out of MDDN studios in Burbank.

Production style
Zakk works mainly in rock, pop and hip hop using guitars and keys along with production software with custom plug-ins.

Production discography
Zakk Cervini produced or provided additional production (e.g., mixing, engineering) to the following projects:

Chasing Ghosts by The Amity Affliction (2012)
Sports by Modern Baseball (2012)
Earth Rocker by Clutch (2013)
Singularity by Northlane (2013)
5 Seconds of Summer by 5 Seconds of Summer (2014)
"The Nights" by Avicii (2014)
"In Between" by Beartooth (2014)
35xxxv by One OK Rock (2015)
Disobedient by Stick To Your Guns (2015)
Future Hearts by All Time Low (2015)
Madness by Sleeping With Sirens (2015)
Sounds Good Feels Good by 5 Seconds of Summer (2015)
The Shadow Side by Andy Black (2016)
Aggressive by Beartooth (2016)
California by Blink 182 (2016)
Youth Authority by Good Charlotte (2016)
Ambitions by One OK Rock (2017)
Cities in Search of a Heart by The Movielife (2017)
Mosaic by 311 (2017)
Mis•an•thrope by DED (2017)
The Knife by Goldfinger (2017)
Awful Things by Good Charlotte (2018)
Summer Is a Curse by The Faim (2018)
Disease by Beartooth (2018)
Generation RX by Good Charlotte (2018)
Vale by Black Veil Brides (2018)
"We Appreciate Power" by Grimes feat. Hana (2018)
In Our Wake by Atreyu (2018)
Am I a Girl? by Poppy (2018)
"11 Minutes" by Yungblud with Halsey & Travis Barker (2019)
Bloodlust by Nothing,Nowhere (2019)
Champion by Bishop Briggs (2019)
The Underrated Youth by Yungblud (2019)
"I Think I'm Okay" by Machine Gun Kelly feat. Yungblud & Travis Barker (2019)
How It Feels to Be Lost by Sleeping with Sirens (2019)
"Loner" by Yungblud (2019)
Strength In Numb333rs by Fever 333 (2019)
Nine by Blink-182 (2019)
Fandom by Waterparks (2019)
Strange Love by Simple Creatures (2019)
Everything Opposite by Simple Creatures (2019)
"Time in a Bottle" from Fast & Furious Presents: Hobbs & Shaw by Yungblud (2019)
"Bad Guy" by The Interrupters (2019)
Meet You There Tour Live by 5 Seconds of Summer (2019)
Proxy: An A.N.I.M.O. Story by Being as an Ocean (2019)
bandaids by Keshi (2020)
I Disagree by Poppy (2020)
The Bastards by Palaye Royale (2020)
All Distortions Are Intentional by Neck Deep (2020)
Wake Up Sunshine by All Time Low (2020)
Weird! by Yungblud (2020)
Tickets to My Downfall (Sold Out Edition) by Machine Gun Kelly (2020)
Post Human: Survival Horror by Bring Me the Horizon (2020)
For Those That Wish to Exist by Architects (2021)
Greatest Hits by Waterparks (2021)
"Shed My Skin" by Within Temptation feat. Annisokay (2021)
None of the Above by Structures
Still Sucks by Limp Bizkit (2021)
 "Bad Life" by Sigrid and Bring Me the Horizon (2022)
The Death of Peace of Mind by Bad Omens (2022)
Harder Than It Looks by Simple Plan (2022)
Scoring the End of the World by Motionless in White (2022)
Reaching Hypercritical by Palisades (2022)
Vaxis – Act II: A Window of the Waking Mind by Coheed and Cambria (2022)
"Miracle" by A Day to Remember (2022)
Hotel Kalifornia by Hollywood Undead (2022)
Unwanted by Pale Waves (2022)
Darker Still by Parkway Drive (2022)
Complete Collapse by Sleeping With Sirens (2022)
Stagger by Poppy (2022)
The Classic Symptoms of a Broken Spirit by Architects (2022)
Remember That You Will Die by Polyphia (2022)

Awards and nominations

Grammy Awards
The Grammy Award is an award presented by The Recording Academy to recognize achievement in the mainly English-language music industry. Cervini received one nomination for his involvement.

Record certifications

References 

1993 births
Living people